The Uckermark concentration camp was a small German concentration camp for girls near the Ravensbrück concentration camp in Fürstenberg/Havel, Germany and then an "emergency" extermination camp.

Overview
The camp was opened in May 1942 as a detention camp for girls, aged 16 to 21, who were considered criminal or difficult. Girls who reached the upper age limit were transferred to the Ravensbrück women's camp. Camp administration was provided by the Ravensbrück camp.  In its early years, the head overseer at Uckermark was a woman named Lotte Toberentz, and one other Aufseherin (female warden) is known today by the name of Johanna Braach.  Both of these women were tried by a British court at the Third Ravensbrück trial.

In January 1945, the juveniles' camp was closed and the infrastructure was subsequently used as an extermination camp for "women who were sick, no longer efficient, and over 52 years old". Over 5,000 women were murdered there; only 500 women and children survived. Though it was shut down in March 1945 the Soviets liberated the camp on the night of April 29–30, 1945. Today only very few structures of the camp lie in ruins, barely recognizable.

Some of the responsible SS wardens of the camp, amongst them chief warden (Oberaufseherin) Ruth Neudeck, were tried in the Third Ravensbrück Trial, called the "Uckermark trial".

See also 
 
 German Resistance to Nazism
 Glossary of Nazi Germany
 The Holocaust
 List of books about Nazi Germany
 List of concentration and internment camps
 List of Nazi-German concentration camps
 Nazi concentration camps
 Nazi Party
 Nazi songs
 World War II

References

External links 
 S. Schäfer: Zum Selbstverständnis von Frauen im Konzentrationslager: das Lager Ravensbrück. PhD thesis 2002, TU Berlin. (PDF file, 741 kB). In German.
 Susanne Luhmann: Memory care and queer akinship at the former Uckermark concentration camp for girls and young women. Memory Studies 2023, Vol. 16(1) p. 32–50

Ravensbrück concentration camp
Buildings and structures in Uckermark (district)
1942 establishments in Germany